Idna or Idhna is a Palestinian town in the southern West Bank, located in the Hebron Governorate of the State of Palestine, 13 kilometers west of Hebron and about one kilometer east of the Green Line. According to the Palestinian Central Bureau of Statistics, the town had a population of approximately 19,012 inhabitants in 2007.

Idna is physically divided into southern and northern parts by the Wadi al-Feranj. Idna's primary source of income is agriculture and the town's total land area is 21,526 dunams, of which  2,809 dunams are built up area. Idna is governed by a municipal council of thirteen members and six departments.

History
Idna's site was inhabited since Canaanite times (the Bronze Age), evident from ancient remains found in the town. The town has been suggested being identified with the biblical city of Dannah, mentioned in the Book of Joshua (15:49) as a town of Judah.

Hebrews, Romans, Byzantines and Arabs succeeded in gaining control of the town and coins, statues, tombs and pottery dating from these various rulers were found in the town.

Writing in the early 4th century, Eusebius mentioned a village named Iedna as being six miles from Eleutheropolis on the road to Hebron.

In 2018, a set of Roman-era tombs from the first century CE, when the region was part of Roman-controlled Judaea, was found in Idna.

Ottoman era
Idna was incorporated into the Ottoman Empire in 1517 with all of Palestine, and in 1596 it appeared in the  tax registers as being  in the nahiya of Halil in the liwa of Quds. It had a population of 68 households, all Muslim. They paid a fixed tax rate of 33,3% on agricultural products, including wheat, barley, olives, vineyards, fruit trees, goats and/or beehives; a total of 19,000  akçe. All of the revenue went to a waqf.

Edward Robinson, who visited Idna in 1838,  recorded that the town's two parts were led by a sheikh and the inhabitants of each part followed and backed their respective sheikh in internal quarrels. Adjacent to Idna are the ruins of the original village which is totally covered by cultivable fields. Marble tesserae (mosaic stones) were found on the site. Idna was further noted as a Muslim village  located between the mountains and the plain of Gaza, but subject to the government of el-Khuhlil.

Victor Guérin visited Idna in June 1863 and  described a village with almost 500 inhabitants, divided into two districts, each ruled by a sheikh. Many houses, especially  a small Bordj, had substructures of stone, which, to all appearances, were dating back to antiquity.

An Ottoman village list of about 1870 showed that Idna had 22 houses and a population of 108, though the population count included only men.

In 1883 the PEF's Survey of Western Palestine (SWP) described Idna as "a small village on the south slope of a hill [ ] divided by a small depression into two." SWP further found that near the town were several large caves with niches for lamps or skulls.

British Mandate era

In the 1922 census of Palestine, conducted by the British Mandate authorities, Idna had a population of 1,300, all Muslim, increasing in the 1931 census to 1,719, still all Muslim, in  317 houses.

In  the 1945 statistics the population of Idna was 2,190, all Muslims, who owned 34,002 dunams of land  according to an official land and population survey. 528 dunams were plantations and irrigable land, 14,481 for cereals, while 153 dunams were built-up (urban) land.

Jordanian era
In the wake of the 1948 Arab–Israeli War, and after the 1949 Armistice Agreements, Idna came under Jordanian rule.

The Jordanian census of 1961 found 3,568 inhabitants in Idna.

1967, aftermath
Since the Six-Day War in 1967, Idna has been under Israeli occupation. The population in the 1967 census conducted by the Israeli authorities was 3,713.

Since 1995, Idna has been governed by the Palestinian National Authority as part of Area B of the West Bank. Today, the population is wholly Muslim.

On 14 April 2014, Baruch Mizrahi, 47-year-old Israeli police officer, was shot dead near Tarqumiyah by a Hamas-affiliated gunman from Idna.

On 25 April 2015, Mahmoud Abu Jheisha, 20 years old, from Idna was shot dead in Hebron after he had been accused of stabbing an Israeli soldier.

References

Bibliography

External links
Welcome To Idna
Idna, Welcome to Palestine
Survey of Western Palestine, Map 21:    IAA, Wikimedia commons 

Idna Town (Fact Sheet), Applied Research Institute–Jerusalem (ARIJ)
Idna Town Profile, ARIJ
Idna aerial photo, ARIJ
The priorities and needs for development in Idna town based on the community and local authorities’ assessment, ARIJ
Idhna, Idna

Cities in the West Bank
Hebrew Bible cities
Municipalities of the State of Palestine